Tarvastu River is a river in Viljandi County, Estonia. The river is 26.9 km long and basin size is 111.4 km2. It runs into Võrtsjärv.

References

Rivers of Estonia
Viljandi County